The R311 is a Regional Route in South Africa that connects the R45 between Malmesbury and Hopefield to the north-west with Riebeek-Kasteel to the south-east.

From the R45, the route heads east. It passes through Moorreesburg, where it meets the N7. It is briefly co-signed heading south, before diverging to head south-east. It passes through Riebeek West to end at Riebeek-Kasteel at an intersection with the R46.

References

External links
 Routes Travel Info
 

Regional Routes in the Western Cape